Mauthausen Orchestra is a musical group founded by Pierpaolo Zoppo, Italian noise musician of the early industrial and power electronics school from the 1980s. Along with Maurizio Bianchi he was one of the pioneers of Italian noise.

Zoppo's work explored morbid subjects, usually extreme sex, perversion, nazism, tortures and disease. The sound was a brutal collage of noise, electronics distortions and very high pitched vocals. The original Mauthausen Orchestra albums were published on Zoppo's own label, Aquilifer Sodality. The original phase of Mauthausen Orchestra ended in 1986, but reformed in 1997 to release new material. Between 1986 - 1997, there was also a Mauthausen Orchestra track called "Kill The P.A.S.T." from "Power To Destroy", an early 90s comp on a label owned by The Grey Wolves. This was credited to simply "Mauthausen". Following a brief return to music in 2008 to work on Ambient music, on June 16, 2012, Pierpalo died.

Discography

Albums
 Mauthausen Orchestra - 1982 (Private tape, limited to 10 copies)
 2nd Movement - 1983
 Dedicated To J. Goebbels - 1983
 Necrofellatio - 1983
 Conflict - 1983
 Vernichtung Lebenunwerten Leben - 1983
 Uneasiness - 1984
 Mafarka - 1984
 Bloodyminded - 1984
 Anal Perversions - 1985
 They Never Learn - 1985
 Host Sodomy - 1986
 Raising Vapors - 1997
 Where Are We Going? - 2008
 From Unhealthy Places (with Nimh) - 2009
 Digression - 2010
 Material Modulations (with Maurizio Bianchi) - 2012
 Dramatisch - 2012
 Spiritual Noises (with Maurizio Bianchi) - 2012

References

Noise musical groups
Italian musical groups